Frank Donlavey, (22 February 1945 – 1 January 2009), was a Scottish soccer player who played in the NASL.

In 1976, he played in the National Soccer League with the Hamilton Italo-Canadians. He died on January 1, 2009.

Managerial career 
Donlavey served as a head coach for Hamilton Italo-Canadians in the National Soccer League in 1978. In 1983, he became the head coach for the McMaster Marauders women's soccer team.

Career statistics

Club

Notes

References

Living people
Scottish footballers
Scottish expatriate footballers
Association football forwards
Arcadia Shepherds F.C. players
Syracuse Scorpions players
Washington Darts players
New York Cosmos players
Miami Toros players
Toronto Blizzard (1971–1984) players
North American Soccer League (1968–1984) players
Expatriate soccer players in the United States
Scottish expatriate sportspeople in the United States
Expatriate soccer players in Canada
Expatriate soccer managers in Canada
Scottish expatriate sportspeople in Canada
1945 births
Canadian National Soccer League coaches
Canadian National Soccer League players